A greenfield airport is an aviation facility with greenfield project characteristics. The designation reflects certain environmental qualities (using previously undeveloped or empty greenfield land, for example) and commissioning, planning and construction processes that are generally carried out from scratch. While a green field in nature is defined as a wide expanse of natural land (meadow, prairie, grassland), here greenfield denotes that a project lacks any constraints imposed upon it by prior work or existing infrastructure. (A brownfield, on the other hand, remodels or improves upon existing facilities.) Such projects can be highly coveted by engineers as no time must be allotted for demolition of unneeded buildings, etc. constructed in developed areas for the development of the particular place

Modern greenfield airports are under construction in Beijing, Istanbul, Sydney and Chennai. Over the next two decades, the number of airports is expected to increase from 133 to 500. Of these, 367 are slated to be greenfield airports.

Partial list of greenfield airports 

Some of the world's greenfield airports opened since 2008. (Many smaller airports are also under development or proposed, especially in China, India and the Philippines.)

 Al Maktoum International Airport (opened June 2010) – Dubai, United Arab Emirates 
 Beijing Daxing International Airport (opened September 2019) - in Langfang, Hebei, China
 Berlin Brandenburg Airport (being built next to Berlin Schönefeld Airport; construction began in 2006; opened October 2020) – in Berlin, Germany
 Bhogapuram Airport (expected in 2024/2025) - near Visakhapatnam, India
 Chennai Greenfield International Airport (announced in August 2022; opening expected in 2027/2028) - Parandur, Kanchipuram, Near Chennai, India
 Chengdu Tianfu International Airport, (construction began in May 2016; opened June 2021) – in Chengdu, China
 Cochin International Airport (opened June 1999) - near Kochi, India
 Dalian Jinzhouwan International Airport (construction began in 2011; opening in 2024) – in Dalian, China
 Hamad International Airport (opened May 2014) – Doha, Qatar 
 Hanthawaddy International Airport - Bago, Myanmar 
 Islamabad International Airport (opened May 2018) - near Rawalpindi and Islamabad, Pakistan
 Istanbul Airport (opened in October 2018) - Istanbul, Turkey
 Itanagar Airport (opened December 2022) - in Hollongi, Arunachal Pradesh, India
 Kannur International Airport (opened December 2018) - in Kerala, India
 Kazi Nazrul Islam Airport (opened September 2013) - Andal, West Bengal, India 
 Kempegowda International Airport (opened May 2008) - near Bangalore, Karnataka, India
 Mattala Rajapaksa International Airport (opened March 2013) - near Hambantota, Sri Lanka
 Mopa Airport (opened January 2023) - in Mopa, Goa, India
 Navi Mumbai International Airport (construction began in 2017; opening expected in 2024) – in Mumbai, India
 New International Airport for Mexico City, (construction began in 2016; project cancelled in 2018) – in Mexico City, Mexico
 New Gwadar International Airport, (expected opening in 2023) - in Gwadar, Pakistan
 Noida International Airport, (construction began in June 2022; opening (Phase - 1) in 2024) - in Jewar, Gautam Buddha Nagar, Near Delhi NCR, India
 Pakyong Airport (opened October 2018) - near Gangtok, Sikkim, India 
 Qingdao Jiaodong International Airport (construction began in 2016; opened August 2021) – in Qingdao, China
 Rajiv Gandhi International Airport (opened March 2008) - near Hyderabad, India
 Rajkot Greenfield Airport (under construction; groundbreaking October 2017; opening in 2023) - near Hirasar in Gujarat, India 
 Shirdi Airport (opened in October 2017) - near Shirdi ,India
 Western Sydney Airport (construction begins late 2018; opening expected 2026) - in Badgerys Creek, Australia
 Xiamen Xiang'an International Airport, (reclamation began in 2013, construction is expected to begin in May 2020; opening is expected in 2025) – in Xiamen, China

See also 
 Greenfield project
 Greenfield land
 Brownfield land

References 

Airports in Asia